The Milwaukee Bucks are an American professional basketball franchise based in Milwaukee, Wisconsin. They are a member of the Central Division of the Eastern Conference in the National Basketball Association (NBA). The team plays their home games at the Fiserv Forum. The Bucks are owned by Wes Edens and Marc Lasry, with Jon Horst as their general manager.

The franchise won its first NBA championship in the 1971 NBA Finals under the leadership of its first coach, Larry Costello, and another in the 2021 NBA Finals under Coach Mike Budenholzer (the only other Bucks' coach other than Don Nelson to have won coach of the year). Don Nelson is the franchise's all-time leader for the most regular season games coached (884), most regular season games won (540), most playoff games coached (88), and most playoff games won (42). Nelson is also the only Bucks coach to win an NBA Coach of the Year Award while also being one of the top 10 coaches in NBA history. Larry Krystkowiak and Joe Prunty are the only people to have spent their entire head coaching career with the Bucks. Mike Dunleavy, Krystkowiak, and Scott Skiles have played and coached for the Bucks. Skiles was the head coach of the Bucks from 2008 until he and the team mutually agreed to part ways in 2013.

Key

Coaches

Notes
 A running total of the number of coaches of the Milwaukee Bucks. Thus, any coach who has two or more separate terms as head coach is only counted once.
 Each year is linked to an article about that particular NBA season.

References
General

Specific

Lists of National Basketball Association head coaches by team

Head coaches